Talkh Ab (also Romanized as Talkh Āb and Talkhāb) is a city in Talkh Ab Rural District, Khenejin District, Farahan County, Markazi Province, Iran. At the 2016 census, its population was 3,681, in 1,162 families.

References 

Populated places in Farahan County